You're Driving Me Crazy is the 39th studio album by Irish musician Van Morrison, his first in collaboration with American jazz organist & trumpeter Joey DeFrancesco. His third album in just seven months, and released on 27 April 2018 by Sony Legacy, it reached the Top 20 in the UK, and features Morrison's daughter, Shana.

Critical reception
Pitchfork found that the album "captures the joy of making music", and praises "Joey DeFrancesco’s hard-driving soul-jazz combo". It notes approvingly that "the quintet knocked out the album in a couple of days, just like acts used to do in the mid-20th-century heyday of Blue Note and Prestige". DeFrancesco is "an ideal foil for Morrison. Respectful but impish", it finds. "Van Morrison continues to prove he’s among the hardest-working vocalists in jazz and its adjacent musical territories", DownBeat concludes. The albums sees Morrison "varying pace and mood to supreme effect", with "DeFrancesco creating a vortex of colliding lines" on the track “Evening Shadows”.

Track listing

Personnel
Van Morrison – vocals, alto saxophone, harmonica
Joey DeFrancesco – Hammond organ, keyboards, trumpet, backing vocals
Dan Wilson – guitar
Michael Ode – drums, percussion
Troy Roberts – tenor saxophone, soprano saxophone
Shana Morrison - backing vocals on "Hold It Right There" and "Have I Told You Lately"

Charts

References

2018 albums
Van Morrison albums